Norton Fredrick (14 November 1937, Wattala – 10 August 2011, Wattala) was a Sri Lankan cricketer. He was primarily a fast bowler who represented Ceylon from 1964 until 1968 before retiring due to family commitments.

On his first-class debut in the Gopalan Trophy in March 1964, he took a hat trick. When Ceylon defeated India in Ahmedabad in January 1965, he took seven wickets in the match, all of top-order batsmen.

He had two sons, one of whom died while serving as an Army officer during the Sri Lankan Civil War.

Death
Fredrick died, aged 73, on 10 August 2011, in his native Wattala, a suburb of Colombo. A road near his home is named after him.

References

External links

Norton Fredrick dies at 73

Norton Frederick, Our "Fiery Fred" by Sa'adi Thawfeeq in The Nation

1937 births
2011 deaths
Sri Lankan cricketers
All-Ceylon cricketers
Bloomfield Cricket and Athletic Club cricketers